The 116th Street station is a local station on the IND Eighth Avenue Line of the New York City Subway. Located at the intersection of 116th Street and 8th Avenue in Harlem, Manhattan, it is served by the B train on weekdays, the C train at all times except nights, and the A train during late nights only.

History
The station opened on September 10, 1932, as part of the city-operated Independent Subway System (IND)'s initial segment, the Eighth Avenue Line between Chambers Street and 207th Street. While the IRT Broadway–Seventh Avenue Line already provided parallel service, the new Eighth Avenue subway via Central Park West and Frederick Douglass Boulevard provided an alternative route.

The station was planned to be rehabilitated as part of the 2015–2019 Metropolitan Transportation Authority Capital Program.

Station layout

This underground station has four tracks and two side platforms. The platforms have name tablets reading "116TH ST." in white sans-serif lettering on a midnight blue background and black border, but no trim line. Small direction and name signs reading "116" in white lettering on a black border run at regular intervals. There are blue I-beam columns that run along both platforms at regular intervals with every other one having the standard black station name plate in white lettering.

Each platform has one same-level fare control area at their extreme south ends. Each one has a turnstile bank and two staircases to the street. The southbound platform has a token booth while the northbound platform does not, having been closed in 2010 and removed several years later.

There are no crossovers or crossunders between the two platforms. As a result, this station and 135th Street are the only two stations on the Eighth Avenue Line north of 59th Street that do not permit free transfers between opposite directions.

Exits
The exits on the northbound platform go up to either eastern corners of 116th Street and Frederick Douglass Boulevard while the exits on the southbound platform go up to either western corners.

Both platforms also had a part-time entrance/exit at the north end to both northern corners of 118th Street and Fredrick Douglass Boulevard, with the northbound platform's entrance/exit leading to the northeastern corner and the southbound platform's entrance/exit leading to the northwestern corner.

Nearby points of interest
East Campus at Columbia University
Morningside Park

References

External links 

 
 Station Reporter — B Train
 Station Reporter — C Train
 The Subway Nut — 116th Street Pictures 
 116th Street entrance at northwest from Google Maps Street View
 Platform from Google Maps Street View

IND Eighth Avenue Line stations
Eighth Avenue (Manhattan)
New York City Subway stations in Manhattan
Railway stations in the United States opened in 1932
Harlem
1932 establishments in New York City